The 1927 Saint Louis Billikens football team was an American football team that represented Saint Louis University during the 1927 college football season. In their second and final season under head coach Robert L. Mathews, the Billikens compiled a 5–5 record and outscored opponents by a total of 140 to 101. The team played its home games at St. Louis University Athletic Field and Sportsman's Park in St. Louis.

Schedule

References

Saint Louis
Saint Louis Billikens football seasons
Saint Louis Billikens football